E. dentatus may refer to:
 Elaeocarpus dentatus, the hinau, a forest tree species native of New Zealand
 Etisus dentatus, a crab species found in the Indo-Pacific

See also 
 Dentatus (disambiguation)